Remind Me may refer to:
"Remind Me" (Brad Paisley and Carrie Underwood song), a song from the 2011 album This Is Country Music
"Remind Me" (Conrad Sewell song), a song from the 2015 extended play All I Know
"Remind Me" (Röyksopp song), a song from the 2001 album Melody A.M.
"Remind Me" (Tom Grennan song) a 2022 song
"Remind Me" (Dorothy Fields and Jerome Kern song), a song for the 1940 show One Night in the Tropics
"Remind Me (Intro)", a song by Eminem from the 2017 album Revival
"Remind Me", a song by Eminem from the 2017 album Revival
"Remind Me", a song by Meghan Trainor from the 2022 album Takin' It Back